Tima formosa is a colonial species of marine hydrozoan in the family Eirenidae. They live in northern parts of the Atlantic Ocean, in the upper epipelagic zone.

It is also the name of a 2010 album by musical artist Oren Ambarchi with Jim O'Rourke and Keiji Haino (Black Truffle).

References

External links
 Drawing
 Drawing

Eirenidae
Animals described in 1862